Rapture is an 2018 American docu-series starring A Boogie Wit Da Hoodie, Logic and 2 Chainz, exploring artists' lives with their families and friends, in the studio and going on tour and putting on shows.

Premise
Rapture follows Hip-hop artists like A Boogie Wit Da Hoodie, Logic and 2 Chainz privately, in the studio and doing shows. Each episode of the series focuses on one of the rappers, and the series is directed by six different directors.

Cast
 A Boogie Wit Da Hoodie
 Logic
 2 Chainz
 Aloe Blacc
 Just Blaze
 Dave East
 G-Eazy
 Dominique Kelley
 Killer Mike
 Lin-Manuel Miranda
 N.O.R.E.
 Nas
 Large Professor
 Rapsody
 Cherie Robinson
 T.I.

Release
It was released on April 2, 2018 on Netflix streaming.

References

External links
 
 
 

2018 American television series debuts
2010s American documentary television series
English-language Netflix original programming
Netflix original documentary television series